FC Tosno during the 2016–17 campaign will be competing in the following competitions: National League, Russian Cup.

Competitions

Results summary

Results by matchday

Matches

External links
  Official website

Tosno
FC Tosno seasons